Nikoloz Mali (born 27 January 1999) is a Georgian professional footballer who plays as a right-back for Erovnuli Liga club Dinamo Tbilisi and the Georgia national team.

Career
Mali made his international debut for Georgia on 8 September 2020 in the UEFA Nations League against North Macedonia.

Career statistics

International

References

External links
 
 
 
 

1999 births
Living people
Footballers from Georgia (country)
Georgia (country) international footballers
Association football fullbacks
FC Saburtalo Tbilisi players
Erovnuli Liga players
Erovnuli Liga 2 players